Vicente Esquerdo Santas (born 2 January 1999) is a Spanish professional footballer who plays as an attacking midfielder for Spanish club Valencia.

Club career
Born in Calp, Alicante, Valencian Community, Esquerdo joined Valencia CF's youth setup from CF Ciudad de Benidorm. He made his senior debut with the reserves on 25 August 2018, coming on as a late substitute for Sito in a 2–0 Segunda División B home win against CD Ebro.

Esquerdo scored his first senior goal on 24 November 2018, netting his team's first in a 2–2 home draw against UB Conquense. He made his first team – and La Liga – debut on 30 November of the following year, replacing Francis Coquelin late into a 2-1 home defeat of Villarreal CF.

On 27 August 2021, Esquerdo was loaned to Primera División RFEF side CD Castellón for one year.

Career statistics

Club

References

External links

1999 births
Living people
People from Marina Alta
Sportspeople from the Province of Alicante
Spanish footballers
Footballers from the Valencian Community
Association football midfielders
La Liga players
Primera Federación players
Segunda División B players
Valencia CF Mestalla footballers
Valencia CF players
CD Castellón footballers